Sociedad Deportiva San Pedro is a Spanish football team based in Sestao, in the autonomous community of Basque Country. Founded in 1923 it plays in División de Honor de Vizcaya, holding home games at Estadio Las Llanas, with a capacity of 8,000 seats. 

The kit manufacturer is Umbro.

History 
The club was founded in 1923. It has a curious story of their equipment choice. When the SD San Pedro was founded, it was agreed to choose as their colors those of the winning club of the 1923 Spanish Championship, which happened to be Barcelona.

Season to season

11 seasons in Tercera División

References

External links
Official website 

Football clubs in the Basque Country (autonomous community)
Association football clubs established in 1923
Divisiones Regionales de Fútbol clubs
1923 establishments in Spain